Baghdad Stadium is a multi-use stadium in Kwekwe, Zimbabwe.  It is currently used mostly for football matches and serves as the home stadium for Lancashire Steel.  The stadium has a capacity of 5,000 people.

Location 
Stadium is located at the heart of the steel industry close to both Lancashire Steel and the works of ZIMASCO. Its proximity of the working suburb of Mbizo, a few miles away, sees it filled to capacity every time Lancashire Steel FC plays league games against the likes of Shabhane Mine, Highlanders FC and Dynamos FC.

See also 
Mbizo Stadium
Rufaro Stadium

References 

Kwekwe
Football venues in Zimbabwe
Stadiums in Zimbabwe
Buildings and structures in Midlands Province
Sports venues completed in 1995
1995 establishments in Zimbabwe